Morgantown is a census-designated place (CDP) in Adams County, Mississippi, United States, located to the northeast of the city of Natchez. As of the 2020 census, it had a population of 1,334.

Demographics

2020 census

Note: the US Census treats Hispanic/Latino as an ethnic category. This table excludes Latinos from the racial categories and assigns them to a separate category. Hispanics/Latinos can be of any race.

References

Census-designated places in Mississippi
Census-designated places in Adams County, Mississippi
Census-designated places in Natchez micropolitan area